Tomáš Nouza (born September 25, 1982) is a Czech professional ice hockey player currently playing for LHK Jestřábi Prostějov in the Czech 1.liga.

He previously played in the Czech Extraliga for HC Dukla Jihlava, Orli Znojmo and BK Mladá Boleslav.

References

External links

1982 births
Living people
BK Mladá Boleslav players
Czech ice hockey forwards
HC Benátky nad Jizerou players
HC Dukla Jihlava players
IHC Písek players
LHK Jestřábi Prostějov players
Motor České Budějovice players
Orli Znojmo players
Sportspeople from Písek
HC Vrchlabí players